The Torrione INA, also known as Torrione  or  Grattacielo, is a tall building in Brescia, Italy. Built between 1930 and 1932, it is the first skyscraper in Italy and also one of the first skyscrapers in Europe. It was designed by the Italian architect Marcello Piacentini for the INA – Istituto Nazionale Assicurazioni ("National Insurance Institute"). At the time of its completion, it was the tallest concrete high-rise in Europe.

The tower was officially opened by Benito Mussolini on 1 November 1932. The architectural style of this building is predominantly Art Deco, with influences from Chicago School. Indeed, the Torrione INA was inspired by a project that Piacentini had submitted in 1922 for the Chicago Tribune's architectural competition.

The Torrione INA had been used as a model for other Italian skyscrapers, such as the Torre Littoria in Turin and the Torre Piacentini in Genoa.

See also
 List of tallest buildings in Italy

References

Skyscrapers in Italy
Buildings and structures completed in 1932
Chicago school (architecture)
Skyscraper office buildings in Italy
Residential skyscrapers in Italy
Italian fascist architecture